The Certified Public Accountants Association (CPAA) (formerly Association of Certified Public Accountants and CPA UK) was formed in 1989 to represent the interests of certain accountants in the United Kingdom.

The association's National Administration Centre and Head Office is in Bolton, England.

Qualification

CPAA offers the designations of Certified Public Accountant (ACPA or FCPA). The American CPA Institute is the main accounting qualification in the United States; there are also many CPAs in China, Australia and elsewhere. CPAA was founded in 1989 to offer a British version.

The association admits members based on either their existing professional accounting body memberships, accountancy qualifications, or experience. As of April 2015 it was pursuing Ofqual recognition as an awarding body; a 2018 document stated that by 2022 it could begin preparations for an application to Ofqual. Entry requirements include membership from an IFAC [International Federation of Accountants] recognized member bodies & associates, also they must complete a practical assessment of their work by providing the association with copies of working-papers which they have prepared.  The association has a 1,500-square-foot training suite that can seat up to 60 trainees.

Members wishing to use the designation Certified Public Accountant, or the designatory letters ACPA/ FCPA, in connection with offering services as a practising public accountant to the general public/business community, must be in possession of a valid, current practising certificate. For a firm to use the designation Certified Public Accountant(s), all the partners or directors/shareholders must be members of the association and the principal must hold a current practising certificate.

Since 2015, CPAA has been recognised as a body whose members are permitted to act as Independent Examiners of accounts for charities in England and Wales.

References

External links
 

Accounting in the United Kingdom
Organisations based in the Metropolitan Borough of Bolton
Organizations established in 1989
Professional accounting bodies
Professional associations based in the United Kingdom
1989 establishments in the United Kingdom